The War that Made America is a PBS miniseries (produced by WQED Pittsburgh) about the French and Indian War, which was first aired in two parts on January 18 and 25, 2006. The series features extensive reenactments of historical events, with on-screen narration provided by Canadian actor Graham Greene. Much of the story focuses upon George Washington, connecting his role in the war with the later American Revolution. Pontiac's War, which followed the French and Indian War, is also covered in the series.  The series was filmed in June, July, and August 2004 in and around the Western Pennsylvania region where many events actually took place during the war.

The book that accompanies the series is The War that Made America: A Short History of the French and Indian War (2005), by historian Fred Anderson.

Besides Washington, historical people portrayed prominently in the film include:
Tanacharison ("Half King")
Sir William Johnson
Edward Braddock
James Smith
Louis-Joseph de Montcalm
Theyanoguin ("King Hendrick")
Mary Jemison
Guyasuta
Jeffery Amherst
Pontiac

Episodes
"A Country Between"
"Unlikely Allies"
"Turning the Tide"
"Unintended Consequences"

External links
 PBS site
 Review of The War that Made America by Colin G. Calloway at OUP Blog
 Pittsburgh Live article
 
 Official site

Works about the French and Indian War
Documentary television series about war
2006 American television series debuts
2006 American television series endings
PBS original programming
Pontiac's War
Cultural depictions of George Washington